Lake Jackson is a city in Brazoria County, Texas, United States, within the Greater Houston metropolitan area. As of the 2020 census, the city population was 28,177.

In 1942 a portion of Lake Jackson was first developed as a company town for workers of the Dow Chemical Company; it developed 5,000 acres on the former Abner Jackson Plantation. An oxbow lake was also named after the planter, whose house was located at the lake. Minor ruins of the Lake Jackson Plantation can now be seen in a park at the site.

History
The city was built in the early 1940s as a planned community, designed by Alden B. Dow of Midland, Michigan for workers in support of a new plant of the Dow Chemical Company, which his father owned. The City of Lake Jackson was incorporated March 14, 1944, and voted for home rule ten years later in 1954.

Geography
The city of Lake Jackson is located in south-central Brazoria County, and is bordered to the east by the cities of Clute and Richwood, and to the southwest by the Brazos River.

Demographics

As of the 2020 United States census, there were 28,177 people, 10,074 households, and 7,028 families residing in the city.

2010 census
As of the census of 2010, there were 26,849 people, 10,319 households, and 7,134 families residing in the city. The racial makeup of the city was 84.36% White, 5.10% African American, 0.52% Native American, 3.14% Asian, 0.04% Pacific Islander, 4.44% from other races, and 2.40% from two or more races. Hispanic or Latino of any race were 20.53% of the population.

There were 9,588 households, out of which 42.6% had children under the age of 18 living with them, 64.7% were married couples living together, 8.5% had a female householder with no husband present, and 23.4% were non-families. Twenty percent of all households were made up of individuals, and 7.3% had someone living alone who was 65 years of age or older. The average household size was 2.74 and the average family size was 3.18.

In the city, the population was spread out, with 26.41% under the age of 18, 5.61% from 20 to 24, 12.51% from 25 to 34, 20.60% from 35 to 49, 20.10% from 50 to 64, and 12% who were 65 years of age or older. The median age was 35 years. For every 100 females, there were 96.06 males. For every 100 females age 18 and over, there were 94.3 males.

The median income for a household in the city was $60,901, and the median income for a family was $69,053. Males had a median income of $60,143 versus $30,398 for females. The per capita income for the city was $25,877. About 5.4% of families and 6.4% of the population were below the poverty line, including 6.5% of those under age 18 and 6.7% of those age 65 or over.

Economy
Gas station and convenience store chain Buc-ee's has its headquarters in Lake Jackson.

The Dow Chemical Company and the Brazosport Independent School District are major employers of residents. Dow planned to develop this community in 1941 as a 5,000-acre residential area for workers at its Freeport plant. Lake Jackson is now home to other chemical and manufacturing facilities, along with many other types of businesses. In Lake Jackson's early days, Dow helped to create a booming economy. In 2014 it announced an expansion project that is estimated to bring nearly 2,000 employees to the area.

The unemployment rate in Lake Jackson, TX, is 8.40%, with job growth of 2.40%. Future job growth over the next ten years is predicted to be 36.40%. The income per capita is $30,625, which includes all adults and children. The median household income is $68,391. The sales tax rate in Lake Jackson, TX, is 8.25%.

Sales tax income represents a population of over 70,000 indicating the draw of the retail shopping from the area.

Arts and culture
The Lake Jackson Library is a part of the Brazoria County Library System.

Government
Lake Jackson is within Texas's 14th congressional district and is represented by Randy Weber.

Education

Public schools

The public schools in the city are operated by Brazosport Independent School District. Some parts of the city limits fall in the Angleton Independent School District and the Columbia-Brazoria Independent School District.

K–5 elementary schools within Lake Jackson include:
 O.M. Roberts Elementary School
 A.P. Beutel Elementary School (2007 National Blue Ribbon School)
 Bess Brannen Elementary School
 Elisabet Ney Elementary School
 T.W. Ogg Elementary

Residents are zoned to:
 Grady B. Rasco Middle School (5–6)
 Lake Jackson Intermediate School (7–8)
 Brazoswood High School (9–12, in Clute, Texas)

Private schools

Private schools within Lake Jackson include:
 Brazosport Christian School
 Our Lady Queen of Peace (of the Roman Catholic Archdiocese of Galveston-Houston)
 Foundation Preparatory Academy

Colleges

Brazosport College is a public community college located in Lake Jackson, with the majority of the Lake Jackson city limits in the college's district. The Texas Legislature designated Brazosport ISD, Columbia-Brazoria ISD, and portions of Angleton ISD that by September 1, 1995 had not been annexed by Alvin Community College as in the Brazosport College zone.

It was recently upgraded to offer a baccalaureate degree in certain technical fields. It is also distinguished for its professional music hall, The Clarion.

Infrastructure
In September 2020, brain-eating amoeba were detected in the Lake Jackson drinking water supply resulting in the death of a 6 year old boy. Eleven samples were taken around the city, and of those, three returned a preliminary positive results: the hose bib at the victim's home, a hydrant at a dead end street, and a storage tank at the city splash pad. This resulted in Brazosport Water Authority issuing a do not use order on tap water in late September 2020.

Airports 
Texas Gulf Coast Regional Airport serves Lake Jackson.

Mass transit 
Southern Brazoria County Transit provides bus service options for Lake Jackson, Clute, Freeport and Angleton.

Highways 

Texas State Highway 332 extends from its west end SH 36 in Brazoria to its east end at Surfside Beach.

Streets 
 The city's layout and the six designs for homes were completed by Michigan architect Alden B. Dow.
 All streets radiating from downtown end in the word "Way." Among the streets are Center Way, Winding Way, Circle Way, and Parking Way. There is an intersection of two streets named This Way and That Way. In the same spirit, a local church near Bess Brannen Elementary placed a small sign in their driveway named His Way. There is also an Any Way.
 Most other streets were named after some form of flora. As the city grew and common names such as Pine, Mulberry, and Oak were taken, developers had to become more creative; thus, among the plants used are Jalapeño, Tangerine, Mango, and Habañero. The highways running through Lake Jackson, (Texas Highways 288 & 332) and Oyster Creek Drive, are exceptions to the naming conventions. The naming convention of "Drive," meaning a route into or out of town, is less honored today than in the beginning.
 Dow intentionally laid out the streets so that they seldom follow straight paths. He wanted to maintain as many trees as possible, a principle still practiced in the development of new subdivisions. In addition, he thought that curving streets provided more surprises in unfolding vistas. Lake Jackson is a part of the National Arbor Day Foundation's Tree City USA list. Also, many of the streets follow Oyster Creek, which twists and winds through town. In many areas of town one can travel in any of the four compass directions and have the same commute time and distance to a destination across town.

Notable people

 Bill Anderson, CEO of Roche Pharmaceuticals, former CEO of Genentech
 Robert Ellis (guitarist), Country, bluegrass and folk singer born, and spent most of his childhood, in Lake Jackson
 King Hill, All-American quarterback at Rice University, first round pick in the 1958 NFL draft, and long-time pro quarterback grew up in Lake Jackson
 Brad Lincoln, a former professional baseball player for the Pittsburgh Pirates and Toronto Blue Jays
 Rand Paul, U.S. senator from Kentucky since 2012; spent most of his childhood in Lake Jackson
 Ron Paul, U.S. representative from Texas's 14th congressional district as well as a Republican presidential candidate in 2008 and 2012. He also ran as the Libertarian Party candidate in 1988
 Selena (1971–1995), Tejano pop singer, known as the Queen of Tejano music
 Ryan Tepera, a relief pitcher for the Toronto Blue Jays of Major League Baseball
 Cole Deggs & The Lonesome (Cole Degges- Vocalist), Multi-platinum songwriter for Kenny Chesney, Gary Allan, Tracy Byrd, Andy Griggs Billy Dean, Chris Janson, Dave Dudley & Josh Ward, he grew up on Pine Street

References

External links

 City of Lake Jackson official website
 Lake Jackson Development Corporation

Cities in Texas
Cities in Brazoria County, Texas
Greater Houston
Company towns in Texas
Populated places established in 1944
Dow Chemical Company